Rhigospira is a genus of flowering plants in the family Apocynaceae, first described as a genus in 1878 by John Miers. The species, Rhigospira quadrangularis was first described as Ambelania quadrangularis by Johannes Müller Argoviensis in 1860 but was transferred to the genus, Rhigospira, in 1878 by John Miers. The genus contains only one known species, Rhigospira quadrangularis, native to northwestern South America (Colombia, Venezuela, Peru, NW Brazil).

formerly placed in the genus
 Rhigospira paucifolia (Müll.Arg.) Miers = Macoubea guianensis Aubl.
 Rhigospira reticulata (A.DC.) Miers = Macoubea guianensis Aubl.
 Rhigospira sinuosa Miers = Macoubea guianensis Aubl.
 Rhigospira sprucei (Müll.Arg.) Miers = Macoubea sprucei (Müll.Arg.) Markgr.
 Rhigospira ternstroemiacea (Müll.Arg.) Miers = Neocouma ternstroemiacea (Müll.Arg.) Pierre
 Rhigospira venulosa Miers = Spongiosperma macrophyllum (Müll.Arg.) Zarucchi

References

Flora of South America
Monotypic Apocynaceae genera
Rauvolfioideae
Plants described in 1860